Šćitarjevo (sometimes spelled Ščitarjevo) is a settlement officially part of the city of Velika Gorica, Croatia.

It is located near the Zagreb bypass and the recently built Homeland Bridge. Its main tourist attraction and cultural site is Andautonia, an archaeological site with remains of a Roman city.

References

Populated places in Zagreb County
Velika Gorica